Halytsynivka is a village in Pokrovsk Raion (district) in Donetsk Oblast of eastern Ukraine, at 36.2 km WNW from the centre of Donetsk city, on the banks of the Vovcha River.

The War in Donbass, that started in mid-April 2014, has brought along both civilian and military casualties. Two Ukrainian servicemen were killed near the village by shelling from "Grad" multiple rocket launchers on 3 February 2017.

Demographics
In 2001 the settlement had 1111 inhabitants. Native language as of the Ukrainian Census of 2001:
Ukrainian — 73.18%
Russian 26.73%
Greek — 0.09%

References

External links
 Weather forecast for Halytsynivka

Villages in Pokrovsk Raion